The Workers' General Confederation of Peru (in Spanish: Confederación General de Trabajadores del Perú CGTP) is a national trade union center in Peru. It was formed in 1929 by José Carlos Mariátegui.

The CGTP is the largest trade union federation in Peru, and is affiliated with the World Federation of Trade Unions.

In August 2013, the CGTP launched a major online campaign (hosted on LabourStart) together with other unions in Peru protesting the new civil service act.

References

External links
 CGTP official site.

Trade unions in Peru
World Federation of Trade Unions
Trade unions established in 1929